Ubay Orifovich Orifov (Russian: Убай Арифович Арифов; 15 June [O.S. 2 June] 1909 – 24 December 1976) was a Soviet Uzbek physicist and academician who served as the President of the Academy of Sciences of the Uzbek SSR from 1962 to 1966. He was also a participant in the Great Patriotic War.

Early life and education 
Ubay Orifov was born in the city of Kokand in the Ferghana Oblast of Russian Turkestan on June 15, 1909. He graduated from the Uzbek State Pedagogical Academy in 1931.

Career 
He worked at the Central Asian University as an assistant from 1935 to 1941. He join the Communist Party of the Soviet Union in 1944. From 1945 to 1956, Orifov was the Director of the Physicotechnical Institute of the Academy of Sciences of the Uzbek SSR, a position he would serve in again from 1963 to 1967. He was then the Director of the Institute of Nuclear Sciences of the Uzbek SSR from 1956 to 1962. He assumed the position of President of the Academy of Sciences of the Uzbek SSR on January 23, 1962 and served until February 26, 1966. He was then the Director of the Institute of Electronics of the Academy of Sciences of the Uzbek SSR. He was also the editor-in-chief of the Reports of the Academy of Sciences of the Uzbek SSR (1962-1966) and Heliotekhnika (1965-1976) magazines.

Orifov's scientific works mainly focused on physical electronics, solid-state surface physics, nuclear and radiation physics, mass spectrometry, and solar technology. He explored the non-stationary processes on the surface of metals and developed methods for determining coefficients of ionization surfaces and the heats of adsorption and desorption. He also explored the patterns of electron emission during the bombardment of metal crystals and film systems by atomic particles. In addition, he developed the mechanisms of potential and kinetic electron emission of various classes of the surface of a solid body; established the possibility of a strong increase in the yield of negative ions from the sprayed surface and laid the foundation for the development of spray sources of negative ions; proved the possibility of directional changes in surface properties using beams of charged particles and developed methods of ion nitriding, passivation, ion-beam treatment, etc.; and designed solar furnaces with a diameter of up to 3 meters, solar photo converters, solar concentrators, etc.

Death 
Ubay Orifov passed away at the age of 67 in Tashkent.

Awards 

 Order of Lenin
 Order of the Red Banner of Labour
Order of the Red Star
 Order of the Badge of Honour (twice)
 Biruni State Prize (1967)
 Order of Outstanding Merit (posthumously, 2002)

See also 

 Academy of Sciences of the Uzbek SSR

References 

1909 births
1976 deaths
Communist Party of the Soviet Union members
Sixth convocation members of the Supreme Soviet of the Soviet Union
Recipients of the Order of Lenin
Recipients of the Order of the Red Banner of Labour
Recipients of the Order of the Red Star
Full Members of the USSR Academy of Sciences
Soviet physicists